Metro Riel is a light rail line proposed for Guatemala's capital, Guatemala City.

Background
In October 2016, it was reported that Spanish consulting engineer IDOM conducted a feasibility study into a  light rail system for Guatemala City, evaluating the cost at $770 million. The project was then shelved, but revisited in 2018.

In April 2019, the Guatemalan national competition agency Pronacom and public private partnership promotion agency Anadie began seeking a consultant for an advanced design study for Metro Riel.

Construction
In 2019, the municipality of Guatemala City signed an agreement with the country’s railway infrastructure manager Ferrovías to use an abandoned heavy rail alignment for the project. Construction is expected to begin in 2021.

References

Transport in Guatemala
Light rail in Guatemala
2023 in rail transport